South Carolina Highway 73 (SC 73) was a primary state highway in the U.S. state of South Carolina.  Established five times in the state, from 1926 to 2006, its last routing was along Ocean Boulevard, in Myrtle Beach, a popular stretch of road lined with hotels, shops, tourist sites and access to the beach.

Route description 
SC 73 began and ended at US 17 Bus., with the southern terminus at Springmaid Beach and the northern terminus in the northern part of Myrtle Beach.

Ocean Boulevard is a major point during the annual Bi-Lo Marathon; full and half marathon runners head south during the first loop of the course, and for full marathon runners only, they head northbound for the second loop. Together, about nine miles (14 km) of the entire marathon course is run on Ocean Boulevard.

History 

SCDOT handed SC 73 over to the city of Myrtle Beach in the 1990s and is no longer an official state route. As such, the route is no longer signed and, as of 2008, the route no longer appears on the official state highway map.

Major intersections

References

External links 
Mapmikey's South Carolina Highways Page: SC 73
Mapmikey's South Carolina Highways Page: SC 73 Alt

073
Roads in Myrtle Beach, South Carolina
Transportation in Horry County, South Carolina